Spain competed at the 1951 Mediterranean Games in Alexandria, Egypt.

Medals

References

External links
Complete 1951 Mediterranean Games Standings
Mediterranean Games Athletic results at Gbrathletics.com

Nations at the 1951 Mediterranean Games
1951
Mediterranean Games